"Right Left Wrong" is a song by Canadian rock band Three Days Grace. It was the third single off of their sixth studio album Outsider. It was written by Neil Sanderson, Gavin Brown, Barry Stock, Brad Walst and Matt Walst. It is the band's 15th song to top the Mainstream Rock chart.

Awards and nominations
"Right Left Wrong" won the Society of Composers, Authors and Music Publishers of Canada "Rock Music Award" in 2020.

Charts

Year-end charts

Release history

References

2018 songs
2018 singles
Three Days Grace songs
RCA Records singles
Song recordings produced by Gavin Brown (musician)
Songs written by Barry Stock
Songs written by Neil Sanderson
Songs written by Gavin Brown (musician)